Game Show Yoo Hee Nak Rak is a 2016 South Korean television program starring Kim Hee-chul, Bae Sung-jae, and Jang Ye-won about video games.

Broadcast time

Format
A video game variety show with celebrity hosts that aims to create a healthy gaming culture. Kim Heechul and other celebrity show hosts introduce and play a variety of video games as they demonstrate how video games can become a tool for improving creativity as well as a hobby.

Cast
 Main Host
 Kim Hee-chul (Super Junior)
 Host
 Hong Jin-ho
 Bae Sung-jae
 Lee Jin-ho
 Jang Ye-won
 Kim So-hye
 Lee Dawon (SF9)
 Shindong (Super Junior)
 Oh Ha-young (Apink)
 Ellin

List of episodes and ratings
In the table below, the blue numbers represent the lowest ratings and the red numbers represent the highest ratings each year.

References

External links 

 

2016 South Korean television series debuts
Korean-language television shows
Seoul Broadcasting System original programming